Pope is a religious title traditionally accorded to the head of the Catholic Church, as well as to some other religious figures. Also used as a surname and a place name.

Pope may also designate:

Religious offices
Pope of Rome, the head of the Catholic Church and sovereign of the State of the Vatican City
Pope Francis (born 1936), the current Pope
A list of popes
Pope of Alexandria and Patriarch of all Africa, the Primate of the Coptic Orthodox Church of Alexandria
Pope Tawadros II of Alexandria, the current Coptic Pope of Alexandria
A list of Coptic Orthodox Popes of Alexandria
Pope and Patriarch of Alexandria and All Africa, the leader of the Chalcedonian Greek Orthodox Church of Alexandria
Pope and Patriarch Theodore II of Alexandria, the current Greek Orthodox Pope of Alexandria.
A list of Greek Orthodox Popes and Patriarchs of Alexandria

People named Pope

Places
Pope (Kakanj), a village in the municipality of Kakanj, Bosnia and Herzegovina
Pope Parish, Ventspils municipality, Latvia

United States
Pope, Alabama
Pope County, Arkansas
Pope, California (disambiguation)
Pope Valley, California
Pope County, Illinois
Pope Township, Fayette County, Illinois
Pope, Kentucky
Pope County, Minnesota
Pope, Mississippi
Pope Air Force Base, North Carolina

Animals
Ruffe, a freshwater fish known as "pope"
Pope (horse), a racehorse

Arts, entertainment, and media

Cards
The Pope or The Hierophant in Tarot cards
Pope Joan (card game)

Fictional characters
Pope, a family surname in Sons of Anarchy
Eli Pope, a character on the television series Scandal
Henry Pope (Prison Break)
Olivia Pope, a character on the television series Scandal

Other uses in arts, entertainment, and media
"Pope", a Prince song from Glam Slam Ulysses
Le Pape (the Pope), by Victor Hugo
The Pope, working title of 2019 film The Two Popes

Brands and enterprises
Pope Manufacturing Company, of bicycles and vehicles
Pope Products, Australian manufacturer of washing machines, etc.
Pope-Toledo, former U. S. car-make

Other uses
Popes (gang), Chicago, US
POPE, the phospholipid 1-Palmitoyl-2-oleoyl-sn-glycero-3-phosphoethanolamine
, three US Navy ships

See also
Antipope
Black Pope (disambiguation)
Justice Pope (disambiguation)

English-language surnames